Adam Fleming was a Scottish footballer who played in the Scottish League for Bathgate, Hibernian and Dundee as a left back.

Personal life 
Fleming's brothers John and William were both footballers.

Career statistics

References 

Scottish footballers
Scottish Football League players
Year of birth missing
Place of birth missing
Year of death missing
Association football fullbacks
Hibernian F.C. players
Dundee F.C. players
Bathgate F.C. players